Raquel Vizcaíno Torre (born 22 June 1967) is a Spanish team handball player who played for the club Vifirehati and for the Spanish national team. She was born in Madrid. She competed at the 1992 Summer Olympics in Barcelona, where the Spanish team placed seventh.

References

1967 births
Living people
Sportspeople from Madrid
Spanish female handball players
Olympic handball players of Spain
Handball players at the 1992 Summer Olympics
Handball players from the Community of Madrid